George Maurice Victor Sellars (16 April 18867 June 1917) was a rugby union player who represented New Zealand fifteen times, including two Test matches. He played club rugby for Ponsonby, and was first selected for Auckland in 1910, and in 1912 gained international selection for New Zealand Māori. Sellars was selected for the All Blacksas New Zealand's international team is knownfor their 1913 tour of North America where he played fourteen matches. As well, he was also in the All Blacks' side that played Australia immediately prior to their tour. Although unavailable to play for New Zealand the following year, he did represent the Māori again that season. In 1915 Sellars enlisted for service in the First War War, and he was fatally wounded in 1917 at the Battle of Messines. He has no known grave and his name is among those recorded on the Messines Ridge (New Zealand) Memorial, at the Messines Ridge British Cemetery.

See also 
 List of international rugby union players killed in World War I

References

External links
 
 
 
 

1886 births
1917 deaths
Military personnel from Auckland
New Zealand international rugby union players
New Zealand rugby union players
Auckland rugby union players
New Zealand military personnel killed in World War I
Ponsonby RFC players
Rugby union players from Auckland
Rugby union hookers
New Zealand Military Forces personnel of World War I
New Zealand Army soldiers